Italy has participated in the Eurovision Young Dancers four times since its debut in 1985. Italy has hosted the contest once, in 1985.

Participation overview

Hostings

See also
Italy in the Eurovision Song Contest
Italy in the Eurovision Young Musicians

References

External links 
 Eurovision Young Dancers

Countries in the Eurovision Young Dancers